St Ippolyts (or St Ippollitts) is a village and civil parish on the southern edge of Hitchin in Hertfordshire, England. It has a population of approximately 2,000.

Governance

North Hertfordshire District Council

St Ippolyts is located within the local government district of North Hertfordshire and within the Ward of Hitchwood, Offa and Hoo.

Hitchwood, Offa and Hoo Ward is a Multi Member Ward represented by three Councillors (Cllr David Barnard (Conservative), Cllr Claire Strong (Conservative) and Cllr Faye Frost (Conservative).

Hertfordshire County Council
St Ippolyts is located within the Hertfordshire County Council Division of Knebworth and Codicote and is represented by Cllr Richard Thake (Conservative).

Parliamentary Representation

The Village is represented in Parliament by Bim Afolami MP (Conservative) who was first elected as the MP for Hitchin and Harpenden in 2017.

Geography

Some features of the village are a 17th-century gabled house, a timber-framed house formerly known as the Olive Branch Inn, and a 16th-century house built around an even older timbered house.

History
The name of St Ippolyts, although spelled in a variety of ways, is derived from St Hippolytus to whom the village church was dedicated. According to Daphne Rance in her book on the parish "St. Ippolyts: a country parish in the nineteenth century" (1987) at various times also known as Epolites, Pallets, Nipples or St Ibbs. In the same vein, the 1881 census mentions the following 28 place names, all of which are believed to refer to it: Iplits, Ipolits, Ipollitts, Ipollyts, Ipolytes, Ipolyts, Ippatyts, Ipplits, Ipployts, Ipplyts, Ippolett, Ippoletts, Ippolits, Ippolitss, Ippolits, Ippolitss, Ippolitts, Ippollit, Ippollits, Ippollitts, Ippollyts, Ippollytts, Ippololits, Ippolts, Ippolytis, Ippolyts, Ippolytts, Ippoplitts. The name of the parish was officially changed from St Ippollitts to St Ippolyts on 2 October 1996. Even in the 21st Century, official road signs to the village on consecutive junctions on the nearby A602 show contradictory spellings of the village name.

St Ippolyts Church 

The church was built in 1087 in a beautiful setting on the hillside above the village. According to the church records, the building was funded by grants supplied by Judith de Lens, the niece of William the Conqueror. De Lens gave evidence against her husband Waltheof, a Saxon Earl, which led to his execution. The funding of the church was an attempt to make amends for this act. The church was rebuilt in the mid nineteenth century using old materials 'recycled' from the nearby abandoned Minsden Chapel. Apart from St Ippolyts, the church also serves the nearby villages of Gosmore and Langley.

The noted theologian Fenton John Anthony Hort (Fenton Hort) is amongst the former vicars of St Ippolyts church where he stayed for 15 years before taking up a fellowship and lectureship at Emmanuel College in Cambridge.

Politician George Lloyd, 1st Baron Lloyd (1879-1941) was buried in the churchyard, as is Geoffrey Lane, Baron Lane (1918-2005), former Lord Chief Justice of England.

Almshoe
The ancient manor of Almshoe, mentioned in the Domesday Book, is located in the south of the parish. Almshoe Bury—now a farmhouse and wedding venue—is a grade I listed building.

Nearby towns and villages
 Gosmore
 Great Wymondley
 Hitchin
 Kings Walden
 Little Wymondley
 Preston
 Stevenage

References

Further reading

External links

 St Ippolyts Church web site

Saint Ippolyts
Areas of Hitchin
Civil parishes in Hertfordshire